The Frente de Liberación de la Mujer (FLM; English: Women's Liberation Front), was a Spanish feminist organization which was founded on 25 January 1976 in Madrid during the transition period after the Francoist era.

Founding members included Jimena Alonso.

References 

Feminist organisations in Spain
1976 establishments in Spain